Jondab (also Romanized as Jondāb and Jandāb; also known as Khandāb and Khund Āb) is a village in Rahjerd-e Sharqi Rural District, Salafchegan District, Qom County, Qom Province, Iran. At the 2006 census, its population was 1,261, in 366 families.

References 

Populated places in Qom Province